Mark Sirengo Mabwete (born 2 July 1974) is a Kenyan former international footballer who played as a midfielder. He was capped 41 times by the Kenya national team and scored 7 goals. He played club football for Eldoret KCC, Mumias Sugar, Simba, APR, ATRACO and Western Stima.

References

External links

1974 births
Living people
Kenyan footballers
Association football midfielders
Mumias Sugar F.C. players
Simba S.C. players
APR F.C. players
ATRACO F.C. players
Western Stima F.C. players
Kenya international footballers